The M'Bato are an Akan people who live in the Ivory Coast.

Ethnic groups in Ivory Coast
Akan